Cryphia fascia is a species of moth in the family Noctuidae (the owlet moths).

The MONA or Hodges number for Cryphia fascia is 9288.

References

Further reading

 
 
 

Cryphia
Articles created by Qbugbot
Moths described in 1903